Review of Market Integration is a peer-reviewed journal that provides a forum to discuss  issues related to market integration as part of the developmental process of emerging economies.

It is published three times in a year by SAGE Publications in association with Foundation.

Abstracting and indexing 
Review of Market Integration is abstracted and indexed in:
 DeepDyve
 Dutch-KB
 EBSCO
 ICI
 J-Gate
 OCLC
 Portico

References
 http://publicationethics.org/members/review-market-integration
 http://idfresearch.org/

External links
 
 Homepage
 SAGE Publications
 India Development Foundation

SAGE Publishing academic journals
Triannual journals
Economics journals
Development studies journals
Publications established in 2009